Celestine Navalayo Masinde (born January 12, 1987) is a Kenyan rugby sevens player. She competed at the 2016 Summer Olympics in the women's rugby sevens competition for the Kenya women's national rugby sevens team. She scored Kenya's first ever Olympic try in their match against France.

Masinde was in the squad that featured at the 2016 France Women's Sevens.

References

External links 
 
 Player Profile

1987 births
Living people
Female rugby sevens players
Rugby sevens players at the 2016 Summer Olympics
Olympic rugby sevens players of Kenya
Kenya international rugby sevens players
Kenya international women's rugby sevens players